Cao Xiwen (born 16 November 1983) is a Chinese actress. She is noted for her roles as Consort Xiao and Gao Cuilan in the television series Beauty World and Journey to the West respectively.

Early life
Cao was born and raised in Jinhua, Zhejiang, where she attended the Zhejiang Arts School, majoring in music and dance. Cao entered Central Academy of Drama in 2004, majoring in acting, where she graduated in 2008.

Acting career
Cao made her acting debut in My World is Beautiful, Because of You (2000), playing a secretary. Cao's first film role was uncredited appearance in the film Pearl Gown (2002).

In 2001, Cao had a minor role as Ding Xiang in the wuxia television series Treasure Raiders, which starred Nicky Wu and Athena Chu.

In 2007, Cao starred in the fantasy television series The Fairies of Liaozhai, based on the novel Strange Stories from a Chinese Studio by Pu Songling.

In 2008, Cao participated in Three Kingdoms, a historical television series adapted from Luo Guanzhong's classical novel Romance of the Three Kingdoms. The series reached number one in the ratings when it aired in China. That same year, she received Huading Award nomination for Best New Actress.

In 2009, Cao played the character Gao Cuilan in Journey to the West, a shenmo television series adaptation based on the novel of the same name.

In 2010, Cao starred  in the historical romance television series Beauty World.

In 2011, Cao headlined the hit drama Wild Duck. Cao was nominated for the Flying Apsaras Award for Best Actress.

In 2012, Cao reprised her role as in the Wild Duck sequel, Wild Duck 2, the series was one of the most watched ones in mainland China in that year.

Personal life
Cao dated Chen Sicheng in September 2008, they split in March 2011.

In 2012, Cao was married to a Taiwanese businessman and had a daughter. They had divorced in 2014.

Filmography

Film

Television series

References

External links

1983 births
People from Jinhua
Living people
Actresses from Zhejiang
Central Academy of Drama alumni
Chinese film actresses
Chinese television actresses
21st-century Chinese actresses